The 184th Pennsylvania House of Representatives District is located in Philadelphia and has been represented since 2019 by Elizabeth Fiedler.

District profile
The 184th Pennsylvania House of Representatives District is located in Philadelphia County and encompasses the Two Street neighborhoods (Pennsport and Whitman), Wells Fargo Center, Lincoln Financial Field and Citizens Bank Park. It also includes the following areas:

 Ward 01
 Ward 39
 Ward 48 [PART, Divisions 14 and 20]

Representatives

Recent election results

References

External links
District map from the United States Census Bureau
Pennsylvania House Legislative District Maps from the Pennsylvania Redistricting Commission.  
Population Data for District 184 from the Pennsylvania Redistricting Commission.

Government of Philadelphia
184